Jacob John Cronenworth (born January 21, 1994) is an American professional baseball infielder for the San Diego Padres of Major League Baseball (MLB).

Cronenworth was born and raised in eastern Michigan. He played three seasons of college baseball for the Michigan Wolverines. Cronenworth forewent his final year of college eligibility when he was selected by the Tampa Bay Rays in the seventh round of the 2015 MLB draft. He played five seasons in the Rays farm system and spent time with the United States national baseball team in 2019.

In December 2019, Cronenworth was sent to the Padres in a multi-player trade. He made his MLB debut in 2020 and finished second in National League (NL) Rookie of the Year voting. On July 16, 2021, Cronenworth hit for the cycle, becoming the third player in Padres history to do so. He received All-Star selections in 2021 and 2022.

Amateur career
Cronenworth attended St. Clair High School in St. Clair, Michigan and played college baseball at the University of Michigan. At Michigan, he was an infielder and closing pitcher In 2014, he played collegiate summer baseball for the Orleans Firebirds of the Cape Cod Baseball League.

Professional career

Tampa Bay Rays
The Tampa Bay Rays selected Cronenworth in the seventh round of the 2015 Major League Baseball (MLB) draft. He made his professional debut with the Hudson Valley Renegades. He played 2016 with the Bowling Green Hot Rods and Charlotte Stone Crabs (batting a combined .282/.389/.386), 2017 with Charlotte and the Montgomery Biscuits (batting a combined .274/.364/.358), and 2018 with Montgomery and Durham Bulls (batting a combined .253/.321/.345).

Cronenworth started 2019 with the Durham Bulls. During the season, he pitched in a game for the first time since college, going 7.1 scoreless innings with 9 strikeouts over seven games. In 2019 playing for two teams in the minor leagues he batted .329/.422/.511 with 10 home runs and 45 RBIs.

After the season, on October 10, 2019, He was selected for the United States national baseball team in the 2019 WBSC Premier 12. In the tournament he batted .103/.133/.241 with one home run and two RBIs in 28 at bats.

Cronenworth was added to the Rays 40–man roster following the 2019 season.

San Diego Padres
On December 6, 2019, Cronenworth and Tommy Pham were traded to the San Diego Padres in exchange for Hunter Renfroe, Xavier Edwards, and a player to be named later (PTBNL). The PTBNL, Esteban Quiroz, was named in March 2020.

Cronenworth made his MLB debut with the Padres on July 26, 2020, and notched a hit and an RBI against the Arizona Diamondbacks. On August 4, Cronenworth hit his first MLB home run off Dustin May in a game against the Los Angeles Dodgers. On August 22, Cronenworth hit his first career grand slam off of Humberto Castellanos of the Houston Astros. Cronenworth was named NL Rookie of the Month in August 2020 after hitting .356 with 16 extra base hits, 17 RBIs and 20 runs over 31 games. Cronenworth finished the season hitting .285 with 4 home runs and 20 RBIs in 54 games. He tied with Alec Bohm of the Philadelphia Phillies for second place in NL Rookie of the Year voting, behind Devin Williams of the Milwaukee Brewers.

On July 4, 2021, Cronenworth was selected to his first All-Star Game as a reserve.  In his first game back from the All-Star Break on July 16, he hit for the cycle at Nationals Park against the Washington Nationals. He finished the 2021 season batting .266/.340/.460 with 21 home runs, 71 RBIs and 94 runs scored.

On January 13, 2023, Cronenworth agreed to a one-year, $4.225 million contract with the Padres, avoiding salary arbitration.

References

External links

1994 births
Living people
Baseball pitchers
Baseball players from Michigan
Bowling Green Hot Rods players
Charlotte Stone Crabs players
Durham Bulls players
Gulf Coast Rays players
Hudson Valley Renegades players
Major League Baseball shortstops
Michigan Wolverines baseball players
Montgomery Biscuits players
National League All-Stars
Orleans Firebirds players
People from St. Clair, Michigan
San Diego Padres players
Sportspeople from Metro Detroit
United States national baseball team players
2019 WBSC Premier12 players